The Flying Mouse is a 1934 Silly Symphonies cartoon produced by Walt Disney, directed by David Hand, and released to theatres by United Artists on July 14, 1934. The use of color here was rather innovative as it is set during the course of a single day.

Plot
To the tune "I Would Like to Be a Bird," a young mouse fashions wings from a pair of leaves, to the great amusement of his brothers. When his attempts to use them fail, the mouse got blown backwards and his rear end crashes into a thorn, he falls into the tub and shrinks his sister's dress and gets spanked by his mother. When a butterfly calls for help, he rescues it from a spider. When the butterfly proves to be a fairy, the mouse wishes for wings. But his bat-like appearance doesn't fit in with either the birds or the other mice, and he finds himself friendless; even the bats make fun of him, making a point that he is "Nothin' But A Nothin'". The butterfly fairy reappears and removes the mouse's wings, telling him: “Be yourself and life will smile on you.” Then the boy mouse runs all the way home where he is reunited with his mother and 3 mouse brothers.

Production
The Flying Mouse boy and his mother make an appearance as spectators in the 1936 Mickey Mouse cartoon Mickey's Polo Team.

Voice cast
 Bat: Billy Sheets
 Male voices: The Three Rhythm Kings
 Bird whistles: Marion Darlington
 Laughing mice: Marcellite Garner

Home media
The short was released on December 4, 2001, on Walt Disney Treasures: Silly Symphonies - The Historic Musical Animated Classics. Prior to that, the featurette also appeared on the Walt Disney Cartoon Classics Limited Gold Edition: Silly Symphonies VHS in the 1980s.

It was also released as a bonus feature, alongside fellow Silly Symphony short Elmer Elephant, on DVD/Blu-Ray releases of Dumbo.

References

External links 

The Flying Mouse at the Encyclopedia of Disney Animated Shorts

1930s English-language films
1934 short films
1934 animated films
American animated short films
1930s Disney animated short films
Silly Symphonies
Animated films about mice
Films about bats
Films about fairies and sprites
Films directed by David Hand
Films produced by Walt Disney
Films scored by Frank Churchill
1930s American films